The Face is a British reality television series based on the American series of the same name. It aired on Sky Living from September to November 2013. The series saw three supermodels - Caroline Winberg, Erin O'Connor and Naomi Campbell - compete with each other to find the newest face of Max Factor.

The premiere of The Face drew poor ratings of only 132,000 viewers, a market share of 0.6% of British households watching TV at the time, and below the audience Sky Living averaged in the same time slot - 239,000 viewers (1% share) - during the year before the show aired. In July 2014, it was confirmed that due to poor ratings, the show was axed and would not return for a second series.

Hosts and Mentors 

The show did not have a host.

Seasons 

Mentor's color symbols
 Team Caroline (Season 1)
 Team Erin (Season 1)
 Team Naomi (Season 1)

See also
 The Face (U.S.)
 Make Me a Supermodel
 Britain and Ireland's Next Top Model

References

External links

Official site

2013 British television series debuts
2013 British television series endings
2010s British reality television series
British fashion
British television series based on American television series
English-language television shows
United Kingdom
Sky Living original programming
Television series by Banijay